Health Service Division is a Bangladesh government division under the Ministry of Health and Family Welfare responsible for healthcare in Bangladesh. Secretary Asadul Islam is the head of the division.

History
In the 1970s the ministry had two divisions but they were combined in 1985. Health Service Division was established on 16 March 2017 through the bifurcation of the Ministry of Health and Family Welfare.

On 17 April 2021, Rozina Islam, a journalist of Prothom Alo, went to the Health Ministry office in the Bangladesh Secretariat for reporting. She was confined in the ministry for five hours and her cell phones were seized. She was then arrested from the Ministry. Sibbir Ahmed Osmani, Deputy Secretary of the Health Services Division, filed a case against her around midnight of 17 April 2021 with Shahbagh police station under the Official Secrets Act.

References

2017 establishments in Bangladesh
Organisations based in Dhaka
Government divisions of Bangladesh